The Tahoe–Pyramid Trail is a planned  long-distance pedestrian and bicycle trail which will run between Lake Tahoe and Pyramid Lake, principally along the routing of the Truckee River.

History
The effort to construct a pedestrian path between the two connected lakes was started in November 2003, undertaken at first by Janet Phillips. The organization responsible for planning and construction of the trail, Tahoe–Pyramid Bikeway, was formed in 2005 (the current name was adopted in 2018 to reflect its multi-use function).

The western portion between Tahoe and the Reno–Sparks area opened to hikers on October 5, 2019, completing the California section of the trail. , two sections are not complete: Vista Blvd to Mustang and USA Parkway to Wadsworth. The Porrtion to Mustang is blocked by landowner issues .

References

External links
Tahoe–Pyramid Trail Main Site

Hiking trails in California
Hiking trails in Nevada
Reno, Nevada
Sparks, Nevada
Truckee, California
Lake Tahoe